Komeyl Metro Station is a station in Tehran Metro Line 7. It is located on the western side of khoshyaran street of Navvab Expressway.

References

Tehran Metro stations